Don Shumpert (born January 8, 1992) is an American football coach who is currently the Bill Bidwill Coaching Fellowship recipient and assistant running backs coach for the Arizona Cardinals of the National Football League (NFL). Shumpert played wide receiver at Iowa.

Early life
Don Shumpert, a St. Louis native, attended Hazelwood East High School, where he was a two-year letterman, playing both wide receiver and defensive back. In his junior season, Hazelwood won the state title. As a senior, Shumpert served as team captain and earned both team MVP and first team all-state honors. Shumpert also achieved all-state honors as a track athlete and was a two-year letterman in basketball.

Playing career
Shumpert was a three-year letterman as a wide receiver for the Iowa Hawkeyes playing from 2010 to 2013. In his career for the Hawkeyes, Shumpert totaled 21 receptions for 211 yards, while also contributing on special teams, collecting 11 career tackles. Shumpert’s best season came his senior season when he recorded 15 receptions for 182 yards. That season, the Hawkeyes posted an 8-5 record and earned an invitation to the 2014 Outback Bowl. Shumpert received the Next Man In Award for offense as a senior. Additionally, he received Academic All-Big Ten honors in both 2012 and 2013.
 
Following his playing career at Iowa, Shumpert was invited to the Chicago Bears Rookie minicamp and the Kansas City Chiefs minicamp in 2014.

Coaching career

Iowa
Shumpert's coaching career started at his alma mater Iowa, where he spent two seasons as a graduate assistant (2016-2017) working with wide receivers and special teams.

New York Giants
Shumpert spent the 2018 NFL season as an offensive assistant wide receivers for the New York Giants.

Arizona Cardinals
On February 12, 2019, the Arizona Cardinals announced that Don Shumpert was the recipient of the Bill Bidwill Coaching Fellowship. He will also be the assistant running backs coach.

References

External links
 Arizona Cardinals bio

1992 births
Living people
American football wide receivers
Arizona Cardinals coaches
Iowa Hawkeyes football coaches
Iowa Hawkeyes football players
New York Giants coaches
Players of American football from St. Louis